"She's a Bad Mama Jama (She's Built, She's Stacked)" is a single by Carl Carlton. The song was written by Leon Haywood and became a major R&B hit, earning Carlton a Grammy Award nomination for Best R&B Vocal Performance, Male  in 1982.  Carlton's subsequent album, Carl Carlton, went gold in 1981. "She's a Bad Mama Jama" has since become a staple of compilation albums and soundtracks.

The track peaked at number 22 in the U.S.  It spent 21 weeks on the American charts, six weeks longer than his bigger hit, "Everlasting Love." "She's a Bad Mama Jama" also spent eight weeks at number two on the R&B/Soul chart.  "She's a Bad Mama Jama" was a Gold record. Outside the US, it reached number 34 in the UK Singles Chart.

Chart performance

Weekly charts

Year-end charts

Certifications

Sampling
The song has been often sampled in rap music, including Foxy Brown and Dru Hill's Big Bad Mamma.
In May 27, 1999, Chinese American singer Coco Lee sampled "She's a Bad Mama Jama" into her track in Mandarin produced by Korean-American Asian music producer Jae Chong called “We Can Dance” featured on her album From Today Until Forever (今天到永遠).

References

External links
 

1981 singles
Songs written by Leon Haywood
1981 songs
20th Century Fox Records singles
Funk songs